Elin Linnéa Landström (born 2 June 1992) is a Swedish professional footballer who plays as a left back for Italian Serie A club AS Roma.

Club career
On 7 July 2022, Landström joined AS Roma.

References

External links 
 
  
 

Living people
1992 births
Swedish women's footballers
Sweden women's international footballers
Damallsvenskan players
Umeå IK players
BK Häcken FF players
Women's association football defenders
Linköpings FC players
Inter Milan (women) players
A.S. Roma (women) players
Serie A (women's football) players
Expatriate women's footballers in Italy
Swedish expatriate sportspeople in Italy
Sportspeople from Norrköping
Footballers from Östergötland County